2014 was the 3rd year in the history of RXF, the largest mixed martial arts promotion based in Romania.

List of events

RXF 9
 

RXF 9: Romania vs. Hungary was a mixed martial arts event that took place on January 31, 2014 at the Sala Polivalentă in Craiova, Romania.

Results

RXF 10
 

RXF 10: Pascu vs. Bunea was a mixed martial arts event that took place on April 5, 2014 at the Sala Polivalentă in Drobeta-Turnu Severin, Romania.

Results

RXF 11
 

RXF 11: Mountain Fight was a mixed martial arts event that took place on May 31, 2014 at the Brașov Ice Arena in Brașov, Romania.

Results

RXF 12
 

RXF 12: Mamaia was a mixed martial arts event that took place on August 4, 2014 at the Piațeta Cazino in Mamaia, Constanța, Romania.

Results

RXF 13
 

RXF 13: Fight Night Moldavia was a mixed martial arts event that took place on October 6, 2014 at the Elisabeta Lipă Arena in Botoșani, Romania.

Results

RXF 14
 

RXF 14: Sibiu was a mixed martial arts event that took place on November 3, 2014 at the Sala Transilvania in Sibiu, Romania.

Results

RXF 15
 

RXF 15: All Stars was a mixed martial arts event that took place on December 15, 2014 at the Sala Polivalentă in Bucharest, Romania.

Results

See also
 2014 in UFC
 2014 in Bellator MMA
 2014 in ONE Championship
 2014 in Absolute Championship Berkut
 2014 in Konfrontacja Sztuk Walki
 2014 in Romanian kickboxing

References

External links
RXF 

2014 in mixed martial arts 
Real Xtreme Fighting events